La Balance (U.S. title: The Nark; literal translation : The Informer) is a 1982 French film directed by Bob Swaim. It stars Nathalie Baye, Philippe Léotard, Tchéky Karyo, Maurice Ronet and Jean-Paul Comart. It won the César Award for Best Film, Best Actor and Best Actress, and was nominated for Most Promising Actor (twice), Best Director, Best Writing – Original and Best Editing. The film had a total of 4,192,189 admissions in France becoming the 5th highest-grossing film of the year.

Plot 
Nicole is a streetwalker in Paris. Her former racketeer boyfriend and pimp, Dédé, has been excluded from the business of a local mob boss, Roger Massina, because of a romantic dispute over Nicole. When a police informant is killed, the police decide to recruit Dédé as a replacement. The police raid Dédé's apartment, find a gun, and blackmail him into becoming an informant using this and other threats.

The police want to get to Massina, and they try to use Dédé to do it. Dédé agrees to participate in a set-up, and tries to return to the good side of Massina by telling him about a rich antique dealer he has found to rob (actually part of the set-up), and asking him for help. Massina yields to greed and agrees to set something up, letting Dédé partially back into his organization.

On the day of the heist, Dédé is part of the team. But Massina doesn't trust Dédé entirely, so he replaces him at the last minute with his semi-psychotic, gun-happy henchman, Petrovic. Dédé calls the police and tries to call off the set-up, but one of the police officers, Le Belge, wearing a Walkman, doesn't hear the call and continues with the plan. Le Belge stages a traffic accident that blocks Massina's van, as planned. As Le Belge stalls Massina's van, Petrovic becomes suspicious, and suddenly begins shooting everyone in sight, killing several civilians and nearly killing Le Belge (who is saved by his Walkman, which absorbs the bullet). Massina slips away into the Métro, but Petrovic is chased and trapped by the police after he ruthlessly kills an officer. Le Capitaine, aware that Petrovic has just shot a number of innocent people and several police officers, shoots Petrovic in the head at point-blank range, killing him, then calmly instructs his officers to reload Petrovic's gun.

Dédé tries to escape but is found by Massina, who prepares to execute him in an alley. Dédé overpowers Massina, however, and turns the gun on him, shooting him in the mouth and killing him. Dédé then goes into hiding, knowing that Massina's crew will come looking for him. But Nicole, his girlfriend, fearing for Dédé's life, deliberately turns him in to the police, who arrest him, on the assumption that he's safer in jail than on the streets. The movie ends with Nicole watching from a car and crying as Dédé is taken away by the police.

Cast 
 Nathalie Baye – Nicole Danet
 Philippe Léotard – Dédé Laffont
 Richard Berry – Mathias Palouzi
 Christophe Malavoy – Tintin
 Maurice Ronet – Massina
 Tchéky Karyo – Petrovic
 Jean-Paul Comart – The Belgian
 Bernard Freyd – The Captain
 Albert Dray – Carlini
 Florent Pagny – Simoni
 Jean-Daniel Laval – Arnaud
 Luc-Antoine Diquero – Picard
 Anne-Claude Salimo – Sabrina
 Sam Karmann – Paulo Sanchez
 François Berléand – Inspector de la Mondaine

References

External links 
 
 

1982 films
1980s crime films
French crime films
Films about prostitution in Paris
Films directed by Bob Swaim
Films featuring a Best Actor César Award-winning performance
Films featuring a Best Actress César Award-winning performance
Best Film César Award winners
Films set in Paris
1980s French-language films
1980s French films